"I Think It's Love  is a song recorded by American R&B singer Jermaine Jackson. It was released as the first single to the album, Precious Moments.

Charts

References

External links
Genius: I Think It's Love - Lyrics

1986 singles
1986 songs
Jermaine Jackson songs
Songs written by Jermaine Jackson
Songs written by Michael Omartian
Songs written by Stevie Wonder